Here We Rest is American musician Jason Isbell's third album, and second with his band The 400 Unit.  It was released April 12, 2011.  On October 18, 2019, the album was re-released with remixing done by Dave Cobb and remastering done by Pete Lyman.

Critical reception

The album received a Metacritic score of 76 based on 15 reviews, indicating generally favorable reviews.  Andrew Leahey of AllMusic found that the songs in the album had captured "archetypal characters that populate most struggling Southern towns" with a "sympathetic soundtrack of folk, country, and bar band rock & roll", one that is "bittersweet, but there’s an air of resilience". Zeth Lundy of Boston Phoenix thought that Isbell had settled into his "comfortable post-Truckers solo-artist groove," and that his voice "is now smoother, older yet less weathered." Nick Coleman of Independent on Sunday however felt that what kept the album from becoming an impressive album is "the slightness of [Isbell's] voice – and his band".

Track listing 

"Go It Alone" was used in Sons of Anarchy Season 4 episode "Booster."  
"Alabama Pines" won Song of the Year at the 2012 Americana Music Awards.

Personnel
Jason Isbell - lead vocal, lead and rhythm guitars, piano, organ
Jimbo Hart - electric bass, upright bass, backup vocals
Browan Lollar - lead and rhythm guitar, backup vocals
Derry deBorja - piano, organ, accordion, backup vocals
Chad Gamble - drums, percussion, backup vocals

Special Guests
Abby Owens - harmony vocals
Amanda Shires - harmony vocals, fiddle

Cover art
Browan Lollar

References

External links
Jason Isbell website

2011 albums
Jason Isbell albums
Lightning Rod Records albums